Skeletophyllon puer is a moth in the family Cossidae. It was described by Yakovlev in 2006. It is found in northern Sumatra.

The length of the forewings is about 11 mm. The forewings are semitransparent, covered with grey scales and with a darkened hind margin. The hindwings are greyish, with a weak reticulate (net-like) pattern at the margin.

Etymology
The species name is derived from Latin puer (meaning a child).

References

Natural History Museum Lepidoptera generic names catalog

Zeuzerinae
Moths described in 2006